The FIFA Youth Tournament Under-18 1951 Final Tournament was held in France.

Teams
The following teams entered the tournament:

 
 
 
  (host)

First round

Supplementary Round
In this round the losing teams from the first round participated.

Semifinals

Fifth-place match

Third place match

Final

External links
Results by RSSSF

1951
1951
1950–51 in European football
1950–51 in French football
1950–51 in Dutch football
1950–51 in English football
1950–51 in Yugoslav football
1950–51 in Austrian football
1950–51 in Belgian football
1950–51 in Northern Ireland association football
1950–51 in Swiss football
March 1951 sports events in Europe
1951 in youth association football